Dimitrios Stavropoulos (Greek: Δημήτριος Σταυρόπουλος; born 1 May 1997) is a Greek professional footballer who plays as a centre-back for Ekstraklasa club Warta Poznań.

Career

Reggina
On 24 August 2020, Stavropoulos joined Serie B club Reggina.

Warta Poznań
In July 2022, Stavropoulos signed for Warta Poznań. On 15 July 2022, he made his Ekstraklasa debut in a 1–0 away loss against Raków Częstochowa.

Career statistics

References

1997 births
Living people
Association football defenders
Footballers from Athens
Greek footballers
Super League Greece players
Serie B players
Ekstraklasa players
Panionios F.C. players
Reggina 1914 players
Warta Poznań players
Greek expatriate footballers
Expatriate footballers in Italy
Expatriate footballers in Poland
Greek expatriate sportspeople in Italy
Greek expatriate sportspeople in Poland
Olympiacos F.C. players